Ignatius Baffour-Awuah (born 24 August 1966), a Ghanaian politician is the Minister of Employment and Labour Relations.

Early life and education 
He was born on 24 August 1966 and hails from Nsoatre in the Bono Region of Ghana. He had his bachelor's degree in accounting in 1992. He also had his post-graduate diploma in management consultancy in 2017.

Political life 
He joined the New Patriotic Party and was a member of  President Kufour's government as a District Chief Executive of the Sunyani District Assembly. He later became the deputy regional minister for the Brong-Ahafo region and subsequently became the regional minister under the same Kuffour administration. He ran for Member of Parliament for the Sunyani West constituency and won in the 2008 parliamentary elections. His party, the NPP however lost the presidential election. He was re-elected as MP in the same constituency in 2012 and 2016. He's therefore the current MP of the Sunyani West constituency. He served as the deputy minority chief whip from 2013 to 2017.

Cabinet minister 
In May 2017, President Nana Akufo-Addo named Baffour-Awuah as part of nineteen ministers who would form his cabinet. The names of the 19 ministers were submitted to the Parliament of Ghana and announced by the Speaker of the House, Rt. Hon. Prof. Mike Ocquaye. As a Cabinet minister, Baffour-Awuah is part of the inner circle of the president and is to aid in key decision-making activities in the country.

Committees 
Baffour-Awuah is a member of House Committee; a member of Privileges Committee and also a member of Committee of Selection Committee.

Personal life 
Baffour-Awuah is married with three children. He is a Catholic.

References

External links 
 Baffour-Awuah wins NPP primaries on modernghana.com from 29. April 2008

1966 births
Living people
Ghanaian Roman Catholics
New Patriotic Party politicians
Ghanaian MPs 2009–2013
Ghanaian MPs 2013–2017
Ghanaian MPs 2017–2021
Cabinet Ministers of Ghana
Ghanaian MPs 2021–2025